Stonko S. "Stan" Pavkov (October 23, 1916 – February 8, 2002) was an American football player and coach. A native of Gooding, Idaho, he played college football for Idaho. After graduating from Idaho, he played professional football for the minor-league Cincinnati Bengals and Paterson Panthers in 1938. He then played in the National Football League (NFL) for the Pittsburgh Steelers during the 1939 and 1940 season.  He appeared in 11 NFL games as an offensive guard and linebacker. After his playing career ended, he returned to Idaho and taught school in American Falls, Blackfoot, and Idaho Falls. In 1948, he moved to Modesto, California, as head track coach and assistant football coach. He later became head football coach, holding that position for 17 seasons and compiling a 66-83-7 record. He later became the athletic director and remained at Modesto Junior college until 1995. After moving to Modesto, he changed his name to S. Stan Pavko. He died in 2002 at age 85 in Modesto.

References

1916 births
2002 deaths
Pittsburgh Steelers players
Idaho Vandals football players
Players of American football from Idaho